Amirabad-e Yek (also Romanized as Amīrābād-e Yek; also known as Amīrābād) is a village in Soghan Rural District, Soghan District, Arzuiyeh County, Kerman Province, Iran. At the 2006 census, its population was 242, in 45 families.

References 

Populated places in Arzuiyeh County